Council Directive 96/82/EC of 9 December 1996 on the control of major-accident hazards involving dangerous substances (as amended) is a European Union law aimed at improving the safety of sites containing large quantities of dangerous substances. It is also known as the Seveso II Directive, after the Seveso disaster. It replaced the Seveso Directive and was in turn modified by the Seveso III directive (2012/18/EU).

See also
 Seveso Directive
Control of Major Accident Hazards Regulations 1999

External links
 Council Directive 96/82/EC of 9 December 1996 on the control of major-accident hazards involving dangerous substances
 Summaries of EU legislation > Environment > Civil protection > Major accidents involving dangerous substances
 European Commission page about the Seveso Directives
 Seveso III Directive (2012/18/EU)

96 82
1996 in law
1996 in the European Union
Environmental law in the European Union
Regulation of chemicals in the European Union